3 Shades of Blue is the final album recorded as leader by American jazz saxophonist Johnny Hodges featuring performances recorded in 1970 with vocalist Leon Thomas and composer/arranger Oliver Nelson and first released on the Flying Dutchman label. The album was rereleased in 1989 under Nelson's leadership as Black, Brown and Beautiful with additional tracks.

Reception

The Allmusic site awarded the album 3 stars.

Track listing
 "Empty Ballroom Blues" (Duke Ellington, Cootie Williams) – 4:54
 "Duke's Place" (Ellington, Bob Thiele, Bill Katz, Ruth Roberts) – 2:35
 "Echoes of Harlem" (Ellington) – 4:20
 "Disillusion Blues" (Leon Thomas) – 3:56
 "Yearning" (Oliver Nelson) – 5:20
 "Welcome to New York" (Thomas) – 4:10
 "Black, Brown and Beautiful" (Nelson) – 3:50
 "Rockin' in Rhythm (Ellington, Harry Carney, Irving Mills) – 3:09
 "Creole Love Call" (Ellington) – 4:56
 "It´s Glory" (Ellington) – 2:55

Personnel
Johnny Hodges – alto saxophone
Leon Thomas – vocals (tracks 2, 4 & 6) 
Oliver Nelson – arranger, conductor
Randy Brecker, Ernie Royal, Marvin Stamm, Snooky Young – trumpet
Al Grey, Quentin Jackson, Garnett Brown, Thomas Mitchell – trombone
Bob Ashton, Danny Bank, Jerry Dodgion, Joe Farrell, Jerome Richardson, Frank Wess – reeds
Earl Hines (tracks 2, 4, 6, 8 & 10), Hank Jones (tracks 1, 3, 5, 7 & 9) – piano
David Spinozza – guitar (tracks 1, 3, 5, 7 & 9)
Ron Carter – bass
Grady Tate – drums

References

Johnny Hodges albums
Oliver Nelson albums
Leon Thomas albums
1970 albums
Albums arranged by Oliver Nelson
Albums conducted by Oliver Nelson
Albums produced by Bob Thiele
Flying Dutchman Records albums